Yazeed Al-Bakr (born 11 November 1995) is a Saudi Arabian professional footballer who plays as a right back for Pro League club Al-Taawoun and the Saudi Arabia national team.

Career
Al-Bakr is an academy graduate of Al-Zulfi. He started his career at Al-Zulfi and spent multiple seasons at club and making appearances in the Second Division and the Third Division. On 5 December 2017, he joined Pro League side Al-Faisaly. On 31 January 2019, he signed his first professional club contract with the club. On 27 June 2019, Al-Bakr joined Al-Ahli on a four-year contract. On 4 July 2021, Al-Bakr joined Al-Taawoun on a three-year contract.

Career statistics

Club

International
Statistics accurate as of match played 21 January 2019.

References

External links
 

1995 births
Living people
Saudi Arabian footballers
Association football defenders
Saudi Professional League players
Saudi Second Division players
Saudi Fourth Division players
Al-Zulfi FC players
Al-Faisaly FC players
Al-Ahli Saudi FC players
Al-Taawoun FC players
Saudi Arabia international footballers
People from Riyadh Province